Barbados is a Swedish dansband, formed in 1992, who have had several Swedish chart successes. The band, with lead singer Magnus Carlsson, became widely known after their second place in Melodifestivalen 2000. The band has replaced lead singer three times. First Magnus Carlsson left the group in 2002 and later became a member of the group Alcazar. Mathias Holmgren, a former Fame Factory student was the new lead singer, but was forced to leave the band in 2004. Chris Lindh replaced him, before leaving the band in 2007. The current lead singer is Björn Lagerström.

The band won its first Grammis Award in February of the year 2000.

Melodifestivalen
The band has participated in the Melodifestivalen music contest four times:
2000: Se mig, placed second
2001: Allt som jag ser, placed second
2002: Världen utanför, placed fourth
2003: Bye, Bye, placed tenth and last

Both lead singer Mathias Holmgren and Magnus Carlsson have participated in Melodifestivalen as solo singers.

Discography

With Magnus Carlsson
1994: Barbados
1997: The Lion Sleeps Tonight
1998: Nu kommer flickorna
1999: Belinda
1999: Rosalita
2000: Kom hem
2000: When the Summer is Gone
2002: Världen utanför

With Mathias Holmgren
2003: Hela himlen

With Chris Lindh
2005: Stolt

Collections
2001: Collection 1994-2001
2003: Rewinder
2005: The Best of Barbados
2009: Upp til dans (Expressen)

References

External links
Official website

Musical groups established in 1992
Dansbands
1992 establishments in Sweden
Melodifestivalen contestants of 2003
Melodifestivalen contestants of 2002
Melodifestivalen contestants of 2001
Melodifestivalen contestants of 2000